The Combat Boat 2010 also known as the "Stridsbåt NY" was a large coastal combat vessel designed to carry the  SSG120 dual 120 mm mortar system in order to provide naval gunfire support to the Swedish Amphibious Forces. Development began in 2005 and progressed until specifications and blueprints were largely finished. In 2008, Genomförandegruppen decided that Sweden would not be buying the AMOS mortar system, and the project was cancelled.

See also
CB90-class fast assault craft
Antasena-class combat boat

Sources 
Protec Magazine nr 1 - 2007

Proposed ships
Ships of the Swedish Navy
Gunboat classes